Nabeel Gareeb is a Pakistani-American businessman. He was the president and chief executive officer as well as a member of the board of directors of MEMC (now SunEdison) between 30 April 2002 and 12 November 2008.

Education 
Gareeb was born in Karachi, Pakistan, and immigrated to the United States over 25 years ago. He holds a Master of Science degree in engineering management from Claremont Graduate School, and a Bachelor of Science degree in engineering from Harvey Mudd College.

Career 
Prior to joining MEMC, he worked for ten years at the International Rectifier Corporation, a supplier of power semiconductors, where he became chief operating officer.

Achievements 
According to a 2007 list compiled by Forbes, Gareeb was one of the highest paid CEOs in the US. He also listed himself in the top 25 highest paid men. Forbes reported him "The 43 year old executive ranks 1 within Semiconductors". His total salary for the five year period from 2003 to 2008 was estimated at $106.06 million.

References

External links 
 Home : SunEdison

Living people
Year of birth missing (living people)
American people of Pakistani descent
American chief executives
American Muslims
Businesspeople from Karachi
Claremont Graduate University alumni
Harvey Mudd College alumni
Pakistani electrical engineers
Pakistani emigrants to the United States
SunEdison